Aaron Pene (born 26 September 1995) is a professional rugby league footballer who plays as a  for the Melbourne Storm in the NRL. 

He previously played for the New Zealand Warriors and Melbourne in the National Rugby League.

Background Early life
Pene is of German and Samoan heritage. Pene played his junior rugby league for Berala Bears and Chester Hill Hornets, before being signed by the Canterbury-Bankstown Bulldogs.

He would play in the NRL Under-20s for Parramatta Eels in 2015, and Wentworthville Magpies in 2017. He injured his knee at the end of 2017 after signing a trial contract with Newtown Jets.

Career

Melbourne Storm: 2019-2021
While playing for the Central Queensland Capras in the 2019 Queensland Cup competition, Pene signed with Melbourne Storm in June 2019, moving to play for Storm feeder club Brisbane Tigers.
Promoted to the club's top 30 for the 2020 season, Pene made his debut in round 20 of the 2020 NRL season for the Melbourne Storm against St. George Illawarra, in a 30–22 loss at Netstrata Jubilee Stadium.

New Zealand Warriors: 2022
On 8 June 2021, the New Zealand Warriors announced that Pene would be joining them on a two-year contract starting 2022. Pene would appear in 14 matches for the Warriors, also making appearances for Redcliffe Dolphins in the Queensland Cup competition. He was granted an early release from his contract by the club in October.

Melbourne Storm: 2023–
Pene rejoined the Melbourne Storm in October 2022, signing a two-year contract to return to where he made his NRL debut in 2020.

References

External links
Warriors profile (archived)
QRL profile 
18th man profile

1995 births
Living people
Australian rugby league players
Australian people of German descent
Australian sportspeople of Samoan descent
Melbourne Storm players
New Zealand Warriors players
Rugby league players from Sydney
Rugby league props